Governor Willoughby may refer to:

Henry Willoughby (governor) (1640–1669), Governor of Barbados from 1664 to 1666 and Governor of Antigua from 1667 to 1670
Francis Willoughby, 5th Baron Willoughby of Parham (1605–1666), Governor of Barbados from 1650 to 1651
William Willoughby, 6th Baron Willoughby of Parham (1610s–1673), Governor of Barbados from 1667 to 1673